Natalia Erdyniyeva (Natálya Konstantínovna Erdyníyeva; born August 6, 1988 in Ulan-Ude, Buryatia) is a Russian archer of the Buryat-Mongol ethnicity. Natalia is a student at Buryat State University in Ulan-Ude. She was trained by her parents, starting with her mother Gerelma Erdyniyeva. Her hobby is dancing.

Early career achievements 
 April 30, 2007 — Silver at the second stage of Archery World Cup 2007, Varese.
 May 28, 2007 — Gold result at the third stage of Archery World Cup 2007, Antalya
 July 7, 2007 — Bronze at the 44th Outdoor Archery World championship, Leipzig.
 July 24, 2007 - Achieved world number one ranking
 November 24, 2007 — Bronze at the Archery World Cup 2007, Dubai.
 April 1, 2008 — Silver at the first stage of Archery World Cup 2008, Santo Domingo

2008 Summer Olympics
At the 2008 Summer Olympics in Beijing Erdyniyeva finished her ranking round with a total of 647 points. This gave her the 11th seed for the final competition bracket in which she faced Nathalie Dielen in the first round, beating the archer from Switzerland with 107-102. In the second round she was too strong for Iwona Marcinkiewicz with 104-103. She was upset in the third round of competition when she lost against 27th seed Zhang Juanjuan with 110-98. Zhang eventually went on to win the gold medal.

References

External links
 
 

Russian female archers
Olympic archers of Russia
Archers at the 2008 Summer Olympics
People from Ulan-Ude
Buryat sportspeople
1988 births
Living people
Archers at the 2015 European Games
European Games competitors for Russia
Buryat State University alumni
Sportspeople from Buryatia